The 29th Producers Guild of America Awards (also known as 2018 Producers Guild Awards), honoring the best film and television producers of 2017, were held at The Beverly Hilton in Beverly Hills, California on January 20, 2018.

The nominations for documentary film were announced on November 20, 2017. The nominations for film and television were announced on January 5, 2018.

Winners and nominees

Film

Television

Milestone Award
 Donna Langley

Stanley Kramer Award
 Get Out

Visionary Award
Ava DuVernay

David O. Selznick Achievement Award in Theatrical Motion Pictures
Charles Roven

Norman Lear Achievement Award in Television
Ryan Murphy

References

External links
 PGA Awards website

 2017
2017 film awards
2017 television awards